Jamey David Shouppe is an American college baseball coach, currently serving as head coach of the Florida A&M Rattlers baseball program. He was named to that position prior to the 2014 season.

Playing career
Shouppe pitched at Wallace Community College for two seasons before completing his eligibility at Florida State.  He was drafted in the eighth round of the 1982 MLB Draft by the Houston Astros and played four seasons in the minor leagues with the organization.  He reached as high as Class-AA, playing two seasons at Columbus.

Coaching career
Shouppe began his coaching career in 1990 when he was hired by Mike Martin at Florida State to serve as Recruiting Coordinator.  He soon added pitching coach duties, and delivered highly ranked recruiting classes and a strong pitching staff for the perennially strong program.  He remained in that position with the Seminoles through 2011.  A year later, he accepted the head coaching position at Coffee High School in Douglas, Georgia serving for the 2013 season.  In July 2013, Shouppe was named head coach at Florida A&M.

Head coaching record
Below is a table of Shouppe's yearly records as an NCAA head baseball coach.

See also

List of current NCAA Division I baseball coaches

References

External links

Living people
1960 births
Baseball pitchers
Asheville Tourists players
Auburn Astros players
Columbus Astros players
Daytona Beach Astros players
Florida State Seminoles baseball coaches
Florida State Seminoles baseball players
Florida A&M Rattlers baseball coaches
High school baseball coaches in the United States
Wallace Governors baseball players
Baseball coaches from Florida
Nova Southeastern University alumni